The 2014 Vietnamese National Football Second League was the 14th season of the Vietnamese National Football Second League

League stage

Group A

Group B

Group C

Group D

Final stage

References

External links
Official Page

2
2014